The Gustave Koerner House is a historic house located at 200 Abend Street in Belleville, Illinois. The Greek Revival house was built in 1848-49 and rebuilt in 1854–55 after a fire. Gustave Koerner, a German immigrant and prominent Illinois politician, lived in the house from its construction to his death in 1896. Koerner served as Lieutenant Governor of Illinois, sat on the Illinois Supreme Court, and was a member of the Illinois House of Representatives. He was also a political ally of Abraham Lincoln during his senatorial and presidential campaigns and convinced many German-American voters to support Lincoln. During the Civil War, Koerner served as United States Minister to Spain and thereafter mounted a failed campaign for Governor of Illinois.

The house was added to the National Register of Historic Places on September 17, 2004. It was converted in 1984 and is currently separated into rental units.

References

Literature

External links
 Gustave Koerner House Restoration

Buildings and structures in Belleville, Illinois
Houses completed in 1849
National Register of Historic Places in St. Clair County, Illinois
Houses on the National Register of Historic Places in Illinois
Houses in St. Clair County, Illinois
1849 establishments in Illinois